Tetraneuris acaulis is a North American species of flowering plants in the sunflower family. Common names include angelita daisy, stemless four-nerve daisy, stemless hymenoxys, butte marigold, and stemless rubberweed.

Description
T. acaulis is a highly variable perennial herb which may be quite tiny to over 60 centimeters (2 feet) in height. The erect stems are surrounded by basal leaves. It flowers from June to September. There may be few or many flower heads borne singly on hairy stalks. At the center are many yellow disc florets, sometimes 200 or more. The fruits are dry achenes only a few millimeters long. Some plants may have no ray florets.

Varieties
It is generally accepted that there are four varieties of this species:
Tetraneuris acaulis var. acaulis: stemless four-nerve daisy – Alberta, Saskatchewan, Colorado, Idaho, Kansas, Montana, Nebraska, New Mexico, North Dakota, Oklahoma, South Dakota, Texas, Wyoming, Chihuahua, Zacatecas
Tetraneuris acaulis var. arizonica: Arizona four-nerve daisy – Arizona, California, Colorado, Idaho, Nevada, Utah
Tetraneuris acaulis var. caespitosa: caespitose four-nerve daisy – Colorado, New Mexico, Wyoming
Tetraneuris acaulis var. epunctata: stemless four-nerve daisy – Colorado, Utah, Wyoming, Coahuila
Tetraneuris acaulis var. nana: stemless four-nerve daisy – Utah

Distribution and habitat 
The species is widespread across much of the western and central United States, west-central Canada (Alberta, Saskatchewan) and northern Mexico (Chihuahua, Coahuila, Zacatecas). It grows in a variety of habitat types in foothills and subalpine regions, and high prairie, badlands, and plains.

Uses 
Tetraneuris acaulis has been used as a traditional medicinal plant. The Hopi used a poultice of the plant to relieve hip and back pain in pregnant women, and to make a stimulating drink.

References

External links

acaulis
Flora of Western Canada
Flora of Northeastern Mexico
Flora of the Western United States
Flora of the Great Plains (North America)
Plants used in traditional Native American medicine
Plants described in 1813
Taxa named by Edward Lee Greene
Taxa named by Frederick Traugott Pursh